The Red Hot Blues of Phil Guy is the first album by blues musician Phil Guy, recorded in March 1982 and released on JSP Records in that same year.

Background and recordings
Three months after they recorded DJ Play My Blues album for Buddy Guy, they entered the Soto Sound Studio in Chicago again to record a new session, but this time led by Phil Guy. They recorded a bunch of songs, which released on two different albums. The first one was released in 1982, and the next a year later, both on JSP. There was some changes in the line-up, Professor Eddie Lusk connected on keyboards, J.W. Williams returned on the bass, Maurice John Vaughn played some saxes.

Releases
The “Red Hot Blues of Phil Guy” released only on vinyl in 1982, but most of the tracks released on Phil Guy’s All Star Chicago Blues Session compilation CD in 1994 by JSP.

Track listing

Note
"Red Dress" is a rework of the blues standard "Hi-Heel Sneakers", written by Tommy Tucker.

Personnel 
 Phil Guy – guitar, vocals
 Buddy Guy – guitar
 Doug Williams – guitar
 Professor Eddie Lusk – keyboards
 J. W. Williams – bass
 Ray Allison – drums
 Maurice John Vaughn - saxophone (tracks 2, 3, 5)
 Larry Cox - harmonica (tracks 2, 6)

References

1982 debut albums
JSP Records albums